Hrnčiarske Zalužany is a village and municipality in the Poltár District in the Banská Bystrica Region of Slovakia. During history the inhabitants had been engaged in the production of pottery. At the end of 18th century in Hrnčiarske Zalužany existed the production of bricks and skids. Pottery production still exists, in the village is production cooperative and quite a few small private producers.

See also
 List of municipalities and towns in Slovakia

References

Genealogical resources
The records for genealogical research are available at the state archive "Statny Archiv in Banska Bystrica, Slovakia"

 Roman Catholic church records (births/marriages/deaths): 1716-1900 (parish B)

External links
 
 
Surnames of living people in Hrnciarske Zaluzany

Villages and municipalities in Poltár District